The Iron Duke engine (also called 151, 2500, Pontiac 2.5, and Tech IV) is a  straight-4 piston engine built by the Pontiac Motor Division of General Motors from 1977 until 1993. Originally developed as Pontiac's new economy car engine, it was used in a wide variety of vehicles across GM's lineup in the 1980s as well as supplied to American Motors Corporation (AMC). The engine was engineered for fuel efficiency, smooth operation, and long life, not for performance. Total Duke engine production is estimated to be between 3.8 and 4.2 million units.

Development

Recognizing that future products would need to be smaller and more fuel-efficient, Pontiac engineers were tasked with developing a new engine that would be suitable for these future products. The engineers considered developing smaller displacement versions of the existing V8, a V6 derived from the V8, a V4 derived from the V8, and an inline-four derived from one of the cylinder banks of the V8 (in the same fashion the 1961 Pontiac Tempest's "Trophy 4" engine), but ultimately decided to create an entirely new four-cylinder engine.

The development team's design goals were to minimize noise and vibration while maximizing durability, drivability, fuel economy, and "usable" power at lower engine speeds. They began by analyzing other four-cylinder engines in production at General Motors at the time, and they found that GM do Brasil's  version of the Chevrolet 153 cu in four-cylinder—with a shorter  stroke and longer  connecting rods—had significantly reduced secondary vibration as compared to the original Chevrolet design and the newer 2.3 L four-cylinder from the Chevrolet Vega. This obviated the need for counter-rotating balance shafts, which would have increased the weight, complexity, and cost of the engine. Despite sharing the same bore, stroke, and cylinder spacing as the Brazilian engine, the majority of parts are not interchangeable.

Focusing on making power at lower engine speeds was a deliberate consideration in order to meet the rest of the design goals. Careful consideration was made to the design of the intake manifold and exhaust gas recirculation system to ensure power output from each cylinder was equalized. Power consumption of the water and oil pumps were reduced, and the piston rings, cylinder bores, and crankshaft journals were designed to minimize friction.

To maximize durability the engine block was made of cast iron with five main bearings, rather than the relatively fragile cast aluminum block used by the 2.3 L Vega engine. (Even with the cast iron block the Iron Duke only weighed about 20 pounds more.) The 2.3 L engine's belt-driven overhead camshaft was eschewed in favor of an overhead valve design with timing gears. Specially-designed bolts that stretch slightly farther than a conventional bolt were used to secure the intake and exhaust manifolds to the cylinder head, to allow slight movement while maintaining the seal of the gaskets in order to prevent cracking the manifolds as they expand with heat.

A two-stage, two-barrel carburetor with electric choke was used to improve performance in cold starts, while heat shields incorporated underneath the carburetor and between the intake and exhaust manifolds were used to prevent heat soaking the gasoline in the carburetor thereby improving performance in hot weather. Recognizing that cars with four-cylinder engines equipped with air conditioning tended to experience drivability issues in hot weather, other improvements were made including a cut-off switch that shut the compressor off at wide open throttle and a delay incorporated into the air conditioning's circuitry to prevent the compressor from engaging on until twelve seconds after the engine was started.

Early applications

The Iron Duke's first applications were in the 1977 Astre and Sunbird subcompact cars, replacing the 2.3 L Vega engine, and in the compact Phoenix. As these cars were originally designed for Chevrolet engines the Iron Duke also used the Chevrolet bell housing bolt pattern, instead of the Buick-Oldsmobile-Pontiac V8 pattern. The following year use of the engine expanded to the Sunbird's Chevrolet and Oldsmobile twins, the Monza and Starfire.

For the 1979 model year, the engine was extensively redesigned. The original reverse-flow cylinder head was replaced by a crossflow design, a new two-barrel carburetor called "Vara-Jet" was introduced, the distributor was relocated, and the size of the oil pan was reduced. The only parts carried over from the 1978 engines were the connecting rods. Peak power increased to 90 hp.

For 1980 the Iron Duke engine was redesigned to be mounted transversely, to suit the new front-drive General Motors "X-body" cars. The bellhousing bolt pattern was revised to match that of the new 60° V6 engine.

GM also began selling the engine to American Motors Corporation (AMC) starting with the 1980 model year. It was the base engine in Spirit, Concord, and Eagle automobiles, as well as in base-model Jeep CJs. The engines purchased by AMC continued to use the Chevrolet V8 bellhousing pattern. The four-cylinder engine was discontinued from AMC's rear-wheel drive models after 1982. During 1983, the all-wheel drive Eagle base engine switched from the Iron Duke to a new, AMC-developed  four-cylinder. The 1980 through 1983 Jeep CJs were also available with the Iron Duke as the base engine.

 1981–1982 AMC Concord
 1981–1983 AMC Eagle
 1980–1982 AMC Spirit
 1980–1981 Buick Skylark
 1980–1981 Chevrolet Citation
 1978–1980 Chevrolet Monza
 1980–1983 Jeep CJ
 1980–1981 Oldsmobile Omega
 1978–1980 Oldsmobile Starfire
 1977 Pontiac Astre
 1977–1981 Pontiac Phoenix
 1977–1980 Pontiac Sunbird
 1977 Pontiac Ventura

Tech IV

Iron Dukes were fitted with fuel injection (TBI, via a single injector in the throttle body) in 1982. This version was christened the Tech IV, though Car and Driver later ridiculed it as the low-Tech IV.

This was replaced by a swirl-port head with 9.0:1 (instead of 8.25:1) compression ratio in 1984 for a  gain. Other additions for 1985 included roller lifters, improved bearings, and a new crankshaft. Several significant changes were made in 1987, which included: an improved cylinder head, intake manifold and throttle-body fuel injection module, a more-modern serpentine belt with an automatic spring-loaded tensioner for the accessories, and a Distributorless Ignition System (DIS). In 1988, a balance shaft was added to smooth engine vibrations. Up to this point, the engine incorporated a 'dogbone' upper front engine mount secured to the cowling of the vehicle's hood latch, aiding in controlling the vibration. Further improvements in later years included new pistons, rods, crankshaft, and an in-pan oiling system. The most powerful variant of the Tech IV raised the rev limit to 5500 rpm, and achieved . The Tech IV uses the same bellhousing pattern as the 2.8 L 60-Degree V6. Over the years, the Tech IV engine has proved to be a reliable workhorse for owners when not pushed to its limits. All 1978-1990 Iron Duke engines used a micarta camshaft gear that meshed directly with a steel gear on the crankshaft. 1991-92 VIN R and U engines used a timing chain instead.

The Grumman LLV (Long Life Vehicle) built from 1987 until 1994 for the United States Postal Service for use in mail delivery were initially powered by the Iron Duke engine. The Postal Service specifications called for a 24-year service life and those with 2.5 L engine have surpassed expectations.

 1982–1992 Buick Century
 1982–1991 Buick Skylark
 1985–1987 Buick Somerset/Somerset Regal
 1985–1990 Chevrolet Astro Cargo Van
 1982–1985 Chevrolet Camaro 
 1982–1990 Chevrolet Celebrity
 1990–1992 Chevrolet Lumina
 1985–1993 Chevrolet S-10
 1985–1987 Chevrolet S-10 Blazer
 1985–1987 GMC S-15 Jimmy
 1985–1993 GMC S-15/GMC Sonoma
 1985–1990 GMC Safari Cargo Van
 1987–1994 Grumman LLV (USPS delivery vehicle)
 1985–1991 Oldsmobile Calais/Cutlass Calais
 1982–1992 Oldsmobile Cutlass Ciera
 1982–1991 Pontiac 6000
 1984–1988 Pontiac Fiero
 1982–1985 Pontiac Firebird
 1985–1991 Pontiac Grand Am

Super Duty
The Iron Duke block formed the basis of Pontiac's Super Duty four-cylinder racing engines of the 1980s, the last in a line of high-performance Pontiac Super Duty engines. The engines were featured in NASCAR's Charlotte/Daytona Dash Series, the IMSA GT Championship (in GTP and GTU class cars), and even in American Power Boat Association racing boats. Super Duty engines continued to be used in ARCA racing until well into the 2000s.

In addition to parts matching the Iron Duke's stock 2.5 L displacement other crankshafts and their corresponding connecting rods were offered by Pontiac Motorsports, resulting in displacements ranging from 2.1 L to 3.2 L. A 2.7 L,  Super Duty engine powered the 1984 Fiero Indy Pace Car to over  during the race, but Super Duty engines were never available in factory-built GM vehicles. However, GM sold the Super-Duty-specific parts at authorized dealers and all of the parts required to convert a stock Iron Duke engine to a Super Duty version were available.

Kansas Racing Products continued to make the engines in the early 21st century after buying rights to make them from GM.

Cosworth also produced a 16-valve, double-overhead cam head for the 3.0 L version of the racing engine (Cosworth Project DBA, 1987).

See also
 GM H platform
 GM engines

References
 1979 chevy Monza Brochure

External links

 Jeep 151 information

Iron Duke
Gasoline engines by model
Straight-four engines